Beauford, was a brown Thoroughbred gelding, performing in Australia was best known for the races against the New Zealand champion Gloaming at Randwick Racecourse in 1922. Beauford raced exclusively in N.S.W from a three-year-old to a nine-year-old recording 17 wins from 6 furlongs to 1½ miles with regular jockey Albert Wood winning 12 races.

Breeding
Beauford was bred by the Mackay family at the Tinagroo stud northwest of Scone by Beau Soult (NZ) and winner of the 1913 Rosehill Guineas his dam Blueford (AUS) was unraced with all seven foals being winners. Beauford was the second foal.

Breeder, William H Mackay born in Dungog was a leading pastoralist having extensive interests throughout N.S.W. and Queensland was also director of Pitt, Son and Badgery and Royal Exchange Assurance died in 1939 aged 81 at his Double Bay residence.

Racing career

Beauford raced between 1919 -1926 but did not race at 2 years and raced for seven seasons which included in the spring of 1922 the historic four successive W.F.A races over distances from 9 furlongs to 1½ miles being the Chelmsford Stakes, Hill Stakes, Spring Stakes and Craven Plate against the champion Gloaming.

Trainer Sid Killick's stables were named 'Myra Bluan' at 32 Everton Street Hamilton, Newcastle and leased the champion Beauford for 2 years then after raced by his breeder other notable stable winners were Myra Bluan 1911 Villiers Stakes, Angelique 1913 Tatts Club Cup, Salrak 1921 Breeders' Plate and Lady Valais 1924 AJC St Leger.

Jockey Albert Wood was considered one of the best jockeys in Australia during World War I into the 1920s, originally from Freeman's Reach Windsor he built a career on success in feature races on the Australian turf with notables being Artilleryman, Cetigne, David, Beauford, Rebus, Kennaquhair, The Fortune Hunter, Richmond Main, Wolaroi, Scarlet and on retirement in 1924 was to become a successful trainer. .

In 1982 The Beauford Club was established in Newcastle to honour the champion and to promote the fellowship of persons in the sport of horse racing.

Beauford's racing record: 37 starts for 17 wins, 5 seconds, 3 thirds and 12 unplaced runs.

1921 & 1922 racebooks

References 

1916 racehorse births
Racehorses bred in Australia
Racehorses trained in Australia
Thoroughbred family 18